Manfred Eigen (9 May 1927 – 6 February 2019) was a German biophysical chemist who won the 1967 Nobel Prize in Chemistry for work on measuring fast chemical reactions.

Eigen's research helped solve major problems in physical chemistry and aided in the understanding of chemical processes that occur in living organisms.

In later years, he explored the biochemical roots of life and evolution. He worked to install a multidisciplinary program at the Max Planck Institute to study the underpinnings of life at the molecular level. His work was hailed for creating a new scientific and technological discipline: evolutionary biotechnology.

Education and early life
Eigen was born on 9 May 1927 in Bochum, the son of Hedwig (Feld) and Ernst Eigen, a chamber musician. As a child he developed a deep passion for music, and studied piano.

World War II interrupted his formal education. At age fifteen he was drafted into service in a German antiaircraft unit. He was captured by the Soviets toward the end of the war. He managed to escape (he said later that escape was relatively easy), and walked hundreds of miles across defeated Germany, arriving in Göttingen in 1945. He lacked the necessary documentation for acceptance to university, but was admitted after he demonstrated his knowledge in an exam. He entered the university's first postwar class.

Eigen desired to study physics, but since returning soldiers who were previously enrolled received priority, he enrolled in Geophysics. He earned an undergraduate degree and entered graduate study in natural sciences. One of his advisors was Werner Heisenberg, the noted proponent of the uncertainty principle. He received his doctorate in 1951.

Career and research
Eigen received his Ph.D. at the University of Göttingen in 1951 under supervision of Arnold Eucken. In 1964 he presented the results of his research at a meeting of the Faraday Society in London. His findings demonstrated for the first time that it was possible to determine the rates of chemical reactions that occurred during time intervals as brief as a nanosecond.

Beginning in 1953 Eigen worked at the Max Planck Institute for Physical Chemistry in Göttingen, becoming its director in 1964 and joining it with the Max Planck Institute for Spectroscopy to become the Max Planck Institute for Biophysical Chemistry. He was an honorary professor of the Braunschweig University of Technology. From 1982 to 1993, Eigen was president of the German National Merit Foundation. Eigen was a member of the Board of Sponsors of The Bulletin of the Atomic Scientists.

In 1967, Eigen was awarded, along with Ronald George Wreyford Norrish and George Porter, the Nobel Prize in Chemistry. They were cited for their studies of extremely fast chemical reactions induced in response to very short pulses of energy.

In addition, Eigen's name is linked with the theory of quasispecies, the error threshold, error catastrophe, Eigen's paradox, and the chemical hypercycle, the cyclic linkage of reaction cycles as an explanation for the self-organization of prebiotic systems, which he described with Peter Schuster in 1977.

Eigen founded two biotechnology companies, Evotec and Direvo.

In 1981, Eigen became a founding member of the World Cultural Council.

Eigen was a member of the Pontifical Academy of Sciences even though he was an atheist. He died on 6 February 2019 at the age of 91.

Personal life
Eigen was married to Elfriede Müller. The union produced two children, a boy and a girl. He later married Ruthild Winkler-Oswatitsch, a longtime scientific partner.

Honours and awards
Eigen won numerous awards for his research including:
 Otto Hahn Prize (1962)
 Elected a member of the American Academy of Arts and Sciences (1964)
 Elected a member of the United States National Academy of Sciences (1966)
 Nobel Prize in Chemistry (1967), shared with Ronald George Wreyford Norrish and George Porter, for his studies on the kinetics of extremely fast running chemical reactions with relaxation methods 
 Elected a member of the American Philosophical Society (1968) 
 Member of the Soviet Academy of Sciences (now the Russian Academy of Sciences) (1976)
 
 Elected a Foreign Member of the Royal Society (ForMemRS) in 1973
 Pour le Mérite (1973)
 Faraday Lectureship Prize from the Royal Society of Chemistry in 1977
 Austrian Decoration for Science and Art
 Lower Saxony State Prize for Science (1980)
 Paul Ehrlich and Ludwig Darmstaedter Prize (1992)
 Helmholtz Medal (Berlin-Brandenburg Academy of Sciences and Humanities, 1994)
 Max Planck Research Award (1994), jointly with Rudolf Rigler of the Karolinska Institute
 Honorary member of the Ruhr University Bochum (2001)
 Lifetime Achievement Award from the Institute of Human Virology in Baltimore (2005)
 Wilhelm Exner Medal (2011)

Honorary doctorates
He received 15 honorary doctorates.

 Honorary Professor, Technical University of Braunschweig (1965)
 Honorary doctorate from Harvard University (1966)
 Honorary doctorate from Washington University in St. Louis (1966)
 Honorary doctorate from the University of Chicago (1966)
 Honorary doctorate from the University of Nottingham (1968)
 Honorary Professor, University of Göttingen (1971)
 Honorary doctorate from Hebrew University of Jerusalem (1973)
 Honorary doctorate from the University of Hull (1976)
 Honorary doctorate from the University of Bristol (1978)
 Honorary doctorate from the University of Debrecen (1982)
 Honorary doctorate from the University of Cambridge (1982)
 Honorary doctorate from Technical University of Munich (1983)
 Honorary doctorate from the University of Bielefeld (1985)
 Honorary doctorate from Utah State University (1990)
 Honorary doctorate from the University of Alicante (1990)
 Honorary doctorate from the University of Coimbra, Portugal (2007)
 Honorary Degree, Scripps Institute of Research (2011)

References

Bibliography

 
 
 
 Manfred Eigen tells his life story at Web of Stories (video)

Interview with Manfred Eigen by Harry Kroto, NL Freeview video provided by the Vega Science Trust.
"Falls ein Gott die Naturgesetze erschuf, so erschuf er auch das Leben durch Evolution" (in German) Interview with Manfred Eigen from 2004, Archive

Further reading

Obituaries

External links 
 "The institute congratulates Manfred Eigen on his 90th birthday!" at mpibpc.mpg.de

  including the Nobel Lecture, December 11, 1967 Immeasurably Fast Reactions

1927 births
2019 deaths
Academic staff of the Technical University of Braunschweig
Faraday Lecturers
Foreign associates of the National Academy of Sciences
Foreign Members of the Royal Society
Foreign Members of the Russian Academy of Sciences
Foreign Members of the USSR Academy of Sciences
Founding members of the World Cultural Council
German biophysicists
German atheists
German Nobel laureates
Max Planck Society people
Members of the European Molecular Biology Organization
Members of the French Academy of Sciences
Members of the Pontifical Academy of Sciences
Nobel laureates in Chemistry
People from Bochum
People from the Province of Westphalia
German physical chemists
Recipients of the Pour le Mérite (civil class)
Studienstiftung alumni
University of Göttingen alumni
Academic staff of the University of Göttingen
Recipients of the Austrian Decoration for Science and Art
Members of the German Academy of Sciences at Berlin
Luftwaffenhelfer
German prisoners of war in World War II held by the Soviet Union
German escapees
Escapees from Soviet detention
Members of the American Philosophical Society
Max Planck Institute directors